Burnett Guffey, A.S.C. (May 26, 1905 – May 30, 1983) was an American cinematographer.

He won two Academy Awards: From Here to Eternity (1953) and Bonnie and Clyde (1967).

Career
While still a teenager, the future Academy Award-winning cinematographer began as a camera assistant in 1923 on John Ford's 1924 western saga The Iron Horse. He was then hired by the Famous Players-Lasky Studios in 1927, became a camera operator in 1928 and worked there until 1943. Guffey was hired as a Director of Photography by Columbia Pictures in 1944.

In 1957–58, he served as president of the American Society of Cinematographers (A.S.C.) for a year, and had been a long-standing member.

According to film critic Spencer Selby, Guffey was a prolific film noir cinematographer, shooting 20 of them, including In a Lonely Place (1950).

Filmography

 Love Over Night (1928)
 Fairways and Foul (1929)
 Tahiti Nights (1944)
 The Unwritten Code (1944)
 Kansas City Kitty (1944)
 The Soul of a Monster (1944)
 U-Boat Prisoner (1944)
 Sailor's Holiday (1944)
 My Name Is Julia Ross (1945)
 The Girl of the Limberlost (1945)
 The Gay Senorita (1945)
 The Blonde from Brooklyn (1945)
 Eve Knew Her Apples (1945)
 I Love a Mystery (1945)
 Eadie Was a Lady (1945)
 Gallant Journey (1946)
 So Dark the Night (1946)
 Night Editor (1946)
 A Bird in the Head (1946)
 The Notorious Lone Wolf (1946)
 Meet Me on Broadway (1946)
 A Close Call for Boston Blackie (1946)
 The Fighting Guardsman (1946)
 Framed (1947)
 Johnny O'Clock (1947)
 The Gallant Blade (1948)
 Screen Snapshots: Smiles and Styles (1948)
 Screen Snapshots: Photoplay Gold Medal Awards (1948)
 The Sign of the Ram (1948)
 To the Ends of the Earth (1948)
 And Baby Makes Three (1949)
 All the King's Men (1949)
 The Reckless Moment (1949)
 The Undercover Man (1949)
 Knock on Any Door (1949)
 Emergency Wedding (1950)
 Convicted (1950)
 In a Lonely Place (1950)
 Father Is a Bachelor (1950)
 The Family Secret (1951)
 Two of a Kind (1951)
 Sirocco (1951)
 Assignment – Paris! (1952)
 The Sniper (1952)
 Scandal Sheet (1952)
 From Here to Eternity (1953)
 The Last Posse (1953)
 The Bamboo Prison (1954)
 Private Hell 36 (1954)
 Human Desire (1954)
 Three Stripes in the Sun (1955)
 Count Three and Pray (1955)
 Tight Spot (1955)
 The Violent Men (1955)
 Storm Center (1956)
 The Harder They Fall (1956)
 Battle Stations (1956)
 Decision at Sundown (1957)
 The Brothers Rico (1957)
 The Strange One (1957)
 Nightfall (1957)
 Me and the Colonel (1958)
 Screaming Mimi (1958)
 The True Story of Lynn Stuart (1958)
 Edge of Eternity (1959)
 They Came to Cordura (1959)
 Gidget (1959)
 Let No Man Write My Epitaph (1960)
 Hell to Eternity (1960)
 The Mountain Road (1960)
 Mr. Sardonicus (1961)
 Homicidal (1961)
 Cry for Happy (1961)
 Kid Galahad (1962)
 Birdman of Alcatraz (1962)
 Good Neighbor Sam (1964)
 Flight from Ashiya (1964)
 King Rat (1965)
 The Silencers (1966)
 The Ambushers (1967)
 Bonnie and Clyde (1967)
 How to Succeed in Business Without Really Trying (1967)
 The Split (1968)
 The Madwoman of Chaillot (1969)
 Some Kind of a Nut (1969)
 The Learning Tree (1969)
 Where It's at (1969)
 Halls of Anger (1970)
 The Great White Hope (1970)
 Suppose They Gave a War and Nobody Came (1970)
 The Steagle (1971)

Awards
Wins
 Academy Awards: Oscar, Best Cinematography, Black-and-White, for From Here to Eternity, 1954
 Academy Awards: Oscar, Best Cinematography, for Bonnie and Clyde, 1968

Nominations
 Golden Globe Awards: Golden Globe, Best Cinematography, Black-and-White, for All the King's Men, 1950
 Academy Awards: Oscar, Best Cinematography, Black-and-White, for The Harder They Fall, 1957
 Academy Awards: Oscar, Best Cinematography, Black-and-White, for Birdman of Alcatraz, 1963
 Academy Awards: Oscar, Best Cinematography, Black-and-White, for King Rat, 1966

References

External links
 
 
 
 Burnett Guffey at Film Reference
 Film Noirs photographed by Burnett Guffey
 Burnett Guffey: four film trailers at Spike TV (iFilm)

American cinematographers
1905 births
1983 deaths
Best Cinematographer Academy Award winners
People from Cocke County, Tennessee
People from Goleta, California